Françoise Combes (born 12 August 1952) is a French astrophysicist at the Paris Observatory and a professor at the Collège de France where she has been the chair of Galaxies and cosmology since 2014.

On 15 September 2017 the 'City of Success' school at Montpellier was renamed as 'High school Françoise Combes'.

Education
Françoise Combes studied at the École Normale Supérieure from 1971 to 1975. In 1975, she obtained the Agrégation and a PhD in Physics from Paris Diderot University, writing her thesis on the dynamics and structure of galaxies.

Research
Her research works are about galaxy formation and evolution, in a cosmological context. This work includes: galaxy dynamics, their spiral and barred structures, and interactions between galaxies, studied both through multi-wavelength observations and by numerical simulations. Additionally, she has published extensively on the interstellar medium of galaxies. In particular, the molecular gas which gives birth to new stars in nearby galaxies, such as Andromeda, and which can be found in high redshift systems. She has published numerous reviews that range in her areas of interest.

Françoise Combes has contributed to various models of dark matter, and is also interested in alternative solutions, such as modified gravity. She collaborated with Daniel Pfenniger in developing a model to account under the form of cold molecular gas for a large fraction of the dark baryons, which have not yet been identified.

Awards and honors
 2022: Nick Kylafis Lectureship 
 2022: Karl Jansky Lecturer
 2021: L'Oréal-UNESCO International Prize for Women in Science 2021
 2021: American Astronomical Society Fellow
2020: Gold Medal of the CNRS
 2019: Commander of National Order of Merit
 2017: The school City of Success of Montpellier (France) was renamed as High school Françoise Combes
 2017: Prix Jules Janssen of the Société astronomique de France, the French Astronomical Society
 2017: Lise Meitner Prize of the University of Technology CHALMERS in Gothenburg
 2017: Honorary member of the American Astronomical Society
 2015: Officer of the French Legion of Honour
 2013: R.M. Petrie Prize of the Canadian Astronomical Society
 2013: Honorary Fellow of the Royal Astronomical Society
 2012: Prix des Trois Physiciens, ENS
 2009: Officer of the National Order of Merit
 2009: Member of the Academia Europaea
 2003: Honorary Fellow of the Royal Astronomical Society, 2013 
 2009: Tycho Brahe Prize of the European Astronomical Society
 2006: Knight of the French Legion of Honour
 2004: Member of the French Academy of Sciences
 2001: Silver Medal of the CNRS 
 1986: IBM physics prize

Bibliography 
Françoise Combes is the author of over a thousand articles, a number of books, and has participated in collective works. Her English-language books include:

 The Milky Way (with James Lequeux), EDP Sciences, 2016, 196p
 Galaxies and Cosmology (Astronomy and Astrophysics Library) (with Patrick Boissé) (translator: M. Seymour), Springer, 2nd Ed 2004, 468p
 The Cold Universe Saas-Fee Advanced Course. vol 32. Swiss Society for Astrophysics and Astronomy (with Andrew W. Blain) (editor: Daniel Pfenniger), Springer, 2004,
 Mysteries Of Galaxy Formation, Praxis, 2010, 224p
La Voie Lactée, 2013, (EdP-Sciences), F. Combes & J. Lequeux
Galaxies et Cosmologie (2009),  (Ellipses), F. Combes, M. Haywood, S. Collin, F. Durret, B. Guiderdoni
A. Aspect, R. Balian, G. Bastard, J.P. Bouchaud, B. Cabane, F. Combes, T. Encrenaz, S. Fauve, A. Fert, M. Fink, A. Georges, J.F. Joanny, D. Kaplan, D. Le Bihan, P. Léna, H. Le Treut, J-P Poirier, J. Prost et J.L. Puget, Demain la physique, (Odile Jacob, 2009)
Mystères de la formation des galaxies (2008),  (Dunod), F. Combes
Galaxies et Cosmologie (1991),  (Inter-Sciences, CNRS), P. Boissé, A. Mazure et A. Blanchard
Galaxies and Cosmology (1995),  (Springer), P. Boissé, A. Mazure et A. Blanchard, (réédité en 2002)

References

External links
 Publications list
 Homepage
  

1952 births
Living people
French astrophysicists
French physicists
French women scientists
Women astrophysicists
École Normale Supérieure alumni
Members of the French Academy of Sciences